Justine Henin defended her title, beating Amélie Mauresmo in the final, 6–4, 7–5.

Seeds
The top four seeds receive a bye into the second round.

Draw

Key
 WC – Wildcard
 Q – Qualifier
 r – Retired

Finals

Section 1

Section 2

External links
Tournament's Draws

Women's Singles
2007 WTA Tour